James Joseph Malloy (born 1963) is a retired vice admiral in the United States Navy, who last served as Deputy Commander, United States Central Command from September 21, 2020 to July 2022.

Malloy served as the Commander United States Naval Forces Central Command/United States Fifth Fleet. He assumed command on December 7, 2018, following the death of Scott Stearney. He previously served as Deputy Chief of Naval Operations for Operations, Plans and Strategy. Malloy was commissioned upon his graduation from United States Naval Academy in 1986. He holds an M.S. degree in systems technology (command, control and communications) from the Naval Postgraduate School, an M.S. degree in national security strategy from the National War College and a Master of Health Sciences degree in emergency and disaster management from Touro University.

Awards and decorations

References

1963 births
Living people
Place of birth missing (living people)
United States Naval Academy alumni
Naval Postgraduate School alumni
National War College alumni
Recipients of the Legion of Merit
United States Navy admirals
Recipients of the Defense Superior Service Medal
Recipients of the Navy Distinguished Service Medal